State Highway 66 (SH 66) is a State Highway in Kerala, India that starts in Alappuzha and ends in Thoppumpady. The highway is 44.1 km long.
Famous pilgrimage shrines such as Arthungal, Thumpoli and Kannamali are on this route. Arthunkal - thumpoly -Kannamaly .

The Route Map 
Alappuzha - Thumpoly - Mararikulam - Arthunkal - Thyckkal - Ottamassery - Andhakaranazhy - Pallithodu - Kannamaly - Thoppumpady.
Alappuzha  -Thumpoly  - Arthunkal  - Andhakaranazhy  - Thoppumpady .

See also 
Roads in Kerala
List of State Highways in Kerala

References 

State Highways in Kerala
Roads in Alappuzha district
Roads in Ernakulam district